Trevor Myke Walker is a Barbudan politician and former Cabinet Minister under the Baldwin Spencer administration.

Early life 
Walker was educated at the Holy Trinity School in Barbuda, which was destroyed in the 2017 Hurricane Irma, but reopened in 2019.

Political career 
Trevor Walker is the leader of the Barbuda People's Movement, and the vice chairman of the Barbuda Council

Trevor Walker was elected a member of the Barbuda Council in 2001, and in 2004, he ran for the Barbuda seat in the Antigua and Barbuda House of Representatives, and tied, but after a recount, won the election. He also won the 2009 and 2018 elections, and was defeated by the Antigua and Barbuda Labour Party in 2014.

In 2012, Trevor Walker, due to the absence of Baldwin Spencer and Harold Lovell (who usually takes the position as acting prime minister), Trevor Walker was the first Barbudan to be appointed as the acting Prime Minister.

In 2020, Gaston Browne stated, this time directly to Walker, that he will order his arrest if he continues to ignore the central governments laws. Another comment made by the Prime Minister in 2020, the Prime Minister’s comments were in response to Walker, who had earlier said in parliament that the prime minister did not have the power to arrest him.

Hurricane Irma 
After Hurricane Irma, in order to rebuild the economy of the island of Barbuda, the Governor-General and the Prime Minister have attempted multiple times to privatize Barbuda's land, due to multiple construction projects being denied by the Barbuda Council.

Barbuda Land Act 
A priority of Trevor Walker is to secure Barbudan people's land rights, even under the pressure of government to privatize the land.

References 

Living people
Year of birth missing (living people)
Barbuda People's Movement politicians
Members of the Barbuda Council
Government ministers of Antigua and Barbuda
Members of the House of Representatives (Antigua and Barbuda)
Saint Leo University alumni
People from Barbuda